Zhang Ji (8th century), courtesy name Yisun, was a Chinese poet born in Xiangyang during the Tang dynasty.

Little is known of his life; his approximate dates are 712–715 to 779; he is known to have passed the jinshi examination in 753. He rose to be a secretary in the Board of Revenue.

He is incorrectly credited under the name Chang Tsi as the author of the original Chinese text for the second movement of Das Lied von der Erde by Gustav Mahler. The actual author of the poem used by Mahler was Qian Qi.

Poetry

Zhang is correctly credited with one poem which was included in the classic anthology Three Hundred Tang Poems, which was translated by Witter Bynner as "A Night-mooring near Maple Bridge" which references the Maple Bridge, in Suzhou() near the Hanshan Temple and its bells, which became famous because of this poem.

Japanese poets used some of his poems for Japanese typical Shigin singing-style poetry.

Notes

References
 Wang, Yunxi and Yang, Ming, "Zhang Ji". Encyclopedia of China (Chinese Literature Edition), 1st ed.

External links
Mahler Archives Website, with poem
Books of the Quan Tangshi that include collected poems of Zhang Ji at the Chinese Text Project:
Book 382
Book 383
Book 384
Book 385
Book 386

Three Hundred Tang Poems poets
People from Xiangyang
Poets from Hubei
8th-century Chinese poets